Clarice Modeste-Curwen is a politician and educator from Grenada.  A member of the New National Party, she has served in the Parliament of Grenada since 1999, and previously served as Minister of Health and the Environment.

References

 Candidate profile on party website

Year of birth missing (living people)
Living people
Foreign ministers of Grenada
Members of the House of Representatives of Grenada
New National Party (Grenada) politicians
Female foreign ministers
20th-century Grenadian women politicians
21st-century Grenadian women politicians
Women government ministers of Grenada
20th-century Grenadian politicians
21st-century Grenadian politicians